Comics published by the British company variously known as Amalgamated Press, Fleetway Publications, Odhams Press and IPC Media.

Titles

# 
 2000 AD (Feb. 1977 – present) — now published by Rebellion Developments

A 
 Action Picture Library (August 1969 - October 1970) — merged with War Picture Library
 Action (comics) (February 14, 1976 – October 23, 1976) — merged with Battle Picture Weekly
 Air Ace Picture Library (January 18, 1960 - November 16, 1970) — merged with War Picture Library
 All-Action Monthly (February - September 1987)

B 
 Battle Picture Library (January 1961 - November 1984)
 Battle Picture Library (Series 2) (January 1985 - March 1992)
 Battle Picture Weekly (March 1975 – January 1988)  — merged with Eagle vol 2.
 Bubbles & The Children's Fairy (1921 – 1941) — merged with Chicks Own
 Buster (comics) (28 May 1960 – 4 January 2000)

C 
 Cheeky (22 October 1977 – 2 February 1980) — merged with Whoopee!
 Chicks Own (1920 – 1957)
 Comic Cuts (1890 - September 1953) — merged into Knockout
 Cor!! (June 1970 – June 1974) — merged into Buster
 Crisis (1988 – 1991)

D 
 Dice Man (1986)
 Disney & Me (1990—present)

E 
 Eagle
 vol. 1 (1950 - 1969) — merged with Lion
 vol. 2 (1982 - 1994)

F 
 Fabulous - renamed Fabulous 208 from June 1966 then Fab 208 from August 1975  (18 January 1964 - 27 September 1980) 
 Fantastic (18 February 1967 — 7 September 1968) — merged into Smash!
 Film Fun (17 January 1920 – 15 September 1962) — merged into Buster
 Funny Wonder (1914 - 1942) — merged with Wonder

I 
 Illustrated Chips (26 July 1890 – 12 September 1953) — merged with Film Fun

J 
 Jack and Jill (27 February 1954 — 29 June 1985)
 Jackpot (5 May 1979 — 30 January 1982) — merged into Buster
 Jet (1 May 1971 - 25 September 1971) - merged into Buster
 Jinty (1974 – 1981) — merged into Tammy
 Judge Dredd Megazine (Oct. 1990 – present) — sister publication to 2000 AD now published by Rebellion Developments

K 
 Knockout 
 vol. 1 (4 March 1939 — 16 February 1963) — merged with Valiant
 vol. 2 (12 June 1971 – 23 June 1973) — merged with Whizzer and Chips
 Krazy (16 October 1976 — 15 April 1978) — merged with Whizzer and Chips

L 
 Lion (23 February 1952 — 18 May 1974) — merged with Valiant
 Look and Learn (20 January 1962 - 17 April 1982)

M 
 M.A.S.K. (1980s) — merged with Eagle vol 2.
 Mirabelle (1956 - 1977) — merged with Pink
 Misty (February 4, 1978 – January 19, 1980) — merged with Tammy
 Monster Fun (14 June 1975 — 30 October 1976) — merged into Buster
 Mystery & Suspense (8 April 1997 — 30 October 1998)

N 
 Nipper (31 January — 12 September 1987) — merged into Buster

O 
 Oink! (3 May 1986 - 22 October 1988) — merged into Buster

P 
 Petticoat (1966 - 1975) — merged with Hi
 Playbox (1925 - 1955) — merged with Jack and Jill
 Playhour (16 October 1954 — 15 August 1987)
 Pow! (21 January 1967 — 13 January 1968) — merged with Wham!
 Puck (1904 - 1940) — merged with Sunbeam

R 
 Radio Fun (15 October 1938 — 18 February 1961) — renamed Radio Fun and Adventure, merged into Buster
 Rainbow (1914 - 1956) — merged with Tiny Tots
 Ranger (8 September 1965 — 18 June 1966) — merged into Look and Learn
 Revolver (July 1990 – January 1991)
 Roy of the Rovers (25 September 1976 – 20 March 1993) — weekly from 1976 to 1993, monthly from 1993 to 1995

S 
 School Fun (15 October 1983 – 26 May 1984) — merged into Buster
 Scorcher (January 1970 – October 5, 1974) — merged with Tiger
 Scream! (March 24, 1984 – 30 June 1984) — merged with Eagle vol 2.

 Shiver and Shake (10 March 1973 to 5 October 1974) — merged into 'Whoopee! Smash! (February 1966 – April 1971) — merged into Valiant Sonic the Comic (29 May 1993 - 9 January 2002)
 Starlord (May 1978 – October 1978) - merged with 2000 AD Sooty (1995-1998)

 T
 Tammy (6 February 1971 - 23 June 1984) — merged with Girl Teenage Mutant Hero Turtles Adventures (January 1990-January 1994)
 Terrific (15 April 1967 — 3 February 1968) — merged into FantasticThriller Comics (November 1951 - May 1963)
 Tiger (Sept. 11, 1954 - March 30, 1985)
 Tiny Tots (1927-1959) — merged with Playhour Tornado (March 1979 - August 1979) - merged with 2000 AD Treasure (14 January 1963 – 16 January 1971) — merged into World of Wonder V 
 Valiant (1962-1976) — merged with Battle Picture Weekly Vulcan (27 September 1975 – 3 April 1976) — merged with Valiant W 
 War at Sea Picture Library (February 5th 1962 - July 1st 1963)
 War Picture Library (1 September 1958 – 3 December 1984)
 War Picture Library (Series 2) (January 1985 – March 1992)
 Wham! (20 June 1964 – 13 January 1968) — merged into Pow! Whizzer and Chips (18 October 1969 – 27 October 1990) — merged into Buster Whoopee! (9 March 1974 to 30 March 1985) — merged into Whizzer and Chips World of Wonder (28 March 1970 – 1 March 1975) — merged into Look and Learn Wow! (5 June 1982 – 25 June 1983) — merged into Whoopee!''

References

External links
Complete List of Harmsworth/Fleetway/IPC comic titles

Lists of comics by publisher